Alexis Guérin may refer to:
Alexis Guérin (cyclist) (born 1992), French cyclist
Alexis Guérin (footballer) (born 2000), French footballer